Domenico Montagnana (24 June 1686 – 6 March 1750) was an Italian master luthier based in Venice, Italy. He is regarded as one of the finest violin and cello makers of his time.

His pieces, particularly his cellos, are sought after by orchestras, notable musicians or collectors, and many form parts of collections in museums. The record price for this luthier was  $903,924 in 2010 for a violin.

Biography 
Montagnana was born in Lendinara, Italy in 1686. His father, Paolo, was a shoemaker. He made stringed musical instruments (violins, violas, cellos and double basses) in Venice. 
He was apprenticed in Matteo Sella's workshop (probably also associated with Matteo Goffriller) and after that he opened his own shop, active from 1712, located in Calle degli Stagneri, with insignia "Alla Cremona".

Typically 1cm shorter than a "forma B" cello made by Stradivarius, and 2cm wider between the C bouts, the signature sound of a Montagnana cello is "uncomplicated" to play (according to Jacqueline du Pré's description of the Montagnana cello played by Martin Lovett of the  Amadeus Quartet ).  One can  hit the bow hard on a Montagnana cello while playing, and the sound will continue to come out and become more interesting.  As a contrast, for a  Stradivarius cello, in general, you have to coax it out (based on a famous description of Jacqueline du Pré's Davidov Stradivarius reputedly made by Yo-Yo Ma: "Jackie's unbridled dark qualities went against the Davydov. You have to coax the instrument. The more you attack it, the less it returns"). 

Montagnana met a Venetian woman living in the Calle degli Stagneri/Santo Bartolomeo district, Caterina Berti, whom he married. The couple lived in Venice and had six daughters. 

Following the birth of their last child, Caterina began suffering from progressive paralysis, which eventually led to her death in 1748. It seems that this final blow was too much for Montagnana, who until then had been seeking refuge in his workshop and spending much longer time than usual on the meticulous details of his instruments. His health began to decline rapidly, for unspecified causes and, by February 1750, he was bedridden. His death certificate states that he died after being confined to his bed for one month with "hypochondria".

He died in Venice, Italy in 1750. His workshop was then inherited by Giorgio Serafin, the nephew of Sanctus Seraphin.

Legacy 
Many of his pieces are still in circulation, used by famous musicians or are part of public or private collections. Artists who play or have played on Montagnanas include Guilhermina Suggia, Stephen Kates, Lionel Tertis, Lynn Harrell, Mischa Maisky, Truls Mørk, Alfred Wallenstein, Josef Roismann, Steven Isserlis, Raphael Wallfisch, Yo-Yo Ma, Paul Watkins, Maurice Eisenberg, Emanuel Feuermann, Daniel Saidenberg, Orlando Cole, Sevak Avanesyan, Nathaniel Rosen, Boris Andrianov, Galen Kelch, Virgil Boutellis-Taft, Sylvia Lent, Ralph Kirshbaum, István Várdai, and Heinrich Schiff.

Famous cellos 
 Petunia (1733) - owned by Yo-Yo Ma
 Ex-Romberg (1733) - on loan to Raphael Wallfisch
 Esquire (1723) - on loan to Harriet Krigjh
 Feuermann (1735) - Swiss collector, previously owned by Emmanuel Feuermann
 Ex-Servais (1738) - owned by Nathaniel Rosen
 Mighty Venetian (1738) - owned by Nathaniel Rosen, previously owned by Adrien-Francois Servais (1807-1866)
 Kates-Hancock (1739) - owned by Stephen Kates until 2003
 Sleeping Beauty (1739) - owned by Heinrich Schiff
 Baron Steinheil (1740) (unknown)
 Duchess of Cleaveland (1740) (unknown)
 Montagnana (1710) - owned by Guilhermina Suggia

Famous violins 
 Mackenzie (1721) 
 Ex-Bloomfield (1731) 
 Ex-Régis Pasquier (1742) - played by Virgil Boutellis-Taft

An international festival with concerts where some of Montagnana's instruments are used is held every year in his native town, Lendinara.

References

Sources 
 Violin and Lute Makers of Venice 1640 - 1760  by Stefano Pio. Ed. Venice research, Venice, Italy, 2004

External links 
 Domenico Montagnana International Festival (Italian/English)
 Cozio
 Fox News archive story 
 Soundpost
 Venice Research
 Domenico Montagnana 

1686 births
1750 deaths
Italian luthiers
People from Venice